Jagadeesha Suchith (born 16 January 1994) is an Indian cricketer who plays for Karnataka cricket team. A left-handed batsman and slow left-arm orthodox bowler, Suchith is also playing in the Indian Premier League.

Career
Suchith played for various age-group teams for Karnataka such as Under-15s, Under-16s, Under-19s, Under-22s, Under-23s and Under-25s, as well as the South Zone Under-19 team. He made his senior cricket debut for Karnataka in the final of the 2014–15 Vijay Hazare Trophy against Punjab at Ahmedabad.

Suchith was bought by the IPL franchise Mumbai Indians at the auction before the 2015 Indian Premier League. He made his IPL debut for Mumbai against Kings XI Punjab. In February 2021, Suchith was bought by the Sunrisers Hyderabad in the IPL auction ahead of the 2021 Indian Premier League. In February 2022, he was bought by the Sunrisers Hyderabad in the auction for the 2022 Indian Premier League tournament.

References

External links
 

1994 births
Living people
Indian cricketers
Karnataka cricketers
Mumbai Indians cricketers
Delhi Capitals cricketers
Punjab Kings cricketers
Sunrisers Hyderabad cricketers
Cricketers from Mysore